Growth impairment may refer to:
 Intrauterine growth restriction
 Impaired economic growth